Suzanne Lyn Shinn (born December 20, 1994) is an American producer, songwriter, and engineer based in Los Angeles. Shinn majored in music production and engineering at Berklee College of Music. She is known for her work with Panic! at the Disco, Weezer, Fall Out Boy, Dua Lipa, and Katy Perry, among many others. She co-wrote and produced "Catch 22" by Australian rapper Illy featuring Anne-Marie which went on to win the 2018 APRA Urban work of the year. In 2019, Shinn also released a Splice sample pack featuring drum and vocal samples.

Selected discography

References 

Living people
American women record producers
American audio engineers
American women songwriters
21st-century American women
1994 births